The Sands Fokker Dr.1 Triplane is an American homebuilt aircraft that was designed by Ron Sands Sr  of Mertztown, Pennsylvania, and produced by Wicks Aircraft and Motorsports. It is a full-sized replica fighter aircraft based upon the 1917-vintage Fokker Dr.1. The aircraft is supplied as a kit and in the form of plans for amateur construction.

Design and development
The aircraft features a strut-braced triplane layout, a single-seat open cockpit, fixed conventional landing gear, and a single engine in tractor configuration.

The Sands Fokker Dr.1 Triplane is made from welded steel tubing and wood, with its flying surfaces covered in doped aircraft fabric. The Le Rhône 9J was the direct basis for the Oberursel Ur.II 110 PS German umlaufmotor rotary that powered production Dr.Is in 1917-18.

The designer estimated the construction time from the supplied kit as 3,000 hours.

Operational history
By 1998 the company reported that 100 sets of plans had been sold and 15 aircraft were completed and flying.

Specifications (Sands Fokker Dr.1 Triplane)

References

External links

Official photo gallery

Fokker Dr.1 Triplane
1990s United States sport aircraft
Single-engined tractor aircraft
Triplanes
Homebuilt aircraft
Replica aircraft